ARK (Access Research Knowledge) is a Northern Irish website in collaboration with Queen's University Belfast and Ulster University. Established in 2000, its primary goal is to increase the accessibility and use of academic data and research.

Users of the website include researchers, teachers, schoolchildren, policy makers, journalists, community/voluntary sector workers and anyone with an interest in Northern Ireland Society and Politics.

Specialist Sections
Life and Times surveys of public attitudes
Elections
Conflict Archive on the INternet (CAIN)
ARK Ageing Programme
Projects
Publications
Events

References 

Ulster University
Queen's University Belfast
Archives in Northern Ireland
Websites of Northern Ireland